The Arab Socialist Union Party of Syria ( Hizb Al-Ittihad Al-Ishtiraki Al-'Arabi fi Suriyah) (ASU) is a Nasserist political party in Syria. ASU was led by Safwan al-Qudsi. The party was formed in 1973, following a split from the original ASU.

At the last legislative elections, 2007, the ASU was part of the National Progressive Front (Al-Jabhat Al-Wataniah Al-Taqaddumiyyah).  the ASU was awarded 8 out of the 250 seats. The NPF is led by the Ba'ath Party.

History

Background: Arab Socialism in Syria
Non-Nasserite Arab socialism in Syria has its origins in the Arab Socialist Party (ASP; also ASM, for Arab Socialist Movement). This party grew out of Syria's Hizb al-Shabab (Youth Party). In 1950, Akram al-Hawrani took over leadership of the party and changed its name to the Arab Socialist Party. After initial successes, the ASP was banned by Syria's de facto leader, Adib ash-Shishakli, in 1952, as he considered it to be too powerful a political rival. Akram al-Hawrani went into exile in Lebanon, and there agreed on a merger with a nationalist and pan-Arabist opposition party, the Arab Ba'ath Party. The new party was called the Arab Socialist Ba'ath Party.

In 1959, the Syrian section of the Baath Party dissolved to leave room for the National Union, which was the only legal party within the United Arab Republic (a Syria-Egypt merger under Gamal Abdel Nasser's leadership). However, dissent over the union grew, and another conference, a year later, reversed the party's decision. When the UAR dissolved in 1961, the Baath Party struggled to reform its Syrian branch, but several groups broke away, including a Nasserist and pro-unionist tendency (which formed the Socialist Unionists, (SU)) and a strongly anti-Nasserist current under Akram al-Hawrani, who recreated his former ASP. Meanwhile, several other Nasserite and pro-Egyptian factions worked in opposition to the "separatist" government and demanded renewed union with Egypt.

Formation as opposition
In 1964, these Syrian Nasserist parties and organizations (including the SUP, the Movement of Arab Nationalists, the United Arab Front and the Socialist Union) created a Syrian branch of the Egyptian-led Arab Socialist Union, which—after a Nasserite coup attempt in the Spring of 1963—was in militant opposition to Syria's Baath-led government. The organization was led by exiles in Cairo, and remained weakly organized in Syria despite considerable popular support, due to restrictions imposed by the Baathists. It quickly fragmented, with a faction of the former SU under Faiz Ismail removing itself from the ASU. The Arab Nationalist Movement also continued to work in their separate organizational structures in Syria, despite being formally committed to Nasser's order to unite in the ASU; much of this organization later dissolved into different political groups, including the ASU and the Palestinian PFLP and DFLP factions.

Legalization and split
After Hafez al-Assad took power in 1970, the ASU entered into negotiations about a coalition government, and agreed to join the National Progressive Front (NPF) in 1972. The year after, however, the party split over the adoption of a Syrian constitution in which the Baath was proclaimed the "leading party" of the country. One minor faction under Fawzi Kiyali accepted the constitution, and retained both the ASU name and the NPF membership, while most members followed party leader Jamal al-Atassi into opposition, by renaming themselves the Democratic Arab Socialist Union. Both ASU (Syria) and DASU distanced themselves from Anwar Sadat's government, particularly after his policies towards Israel became more conciliatory, and their close relations with Cairo were lost before the Egyptian mother party itself dissolved in the mid-1970s.

ASU and DASU today
The Arab Socialist Union Party of Syria (i.e., the ex-Kiyali faction), which glorifies the Baath presidency and shows virtually no independence from the government, has long been led by Safwan al-Qudsi. In the 2003 legislative elections, the NPF bloc was awarded 167 out of 250 seats in the Syrian parliament, and of these seven belonged to the ASU. In the 2007 elections, the party was awarded 8 out of 250 seats in the parliament, making it formally the second-largest party after the Baath itself. This does not reflect popular support for the party, however, since the NPF runs on uncontested lists; on these, the Baath always holds a majority both inside the NPF and inside the parliament, while other member parties negotiate with the government for their share of candidates.

Since the death of al-Atassi, the DASU has been led by Hassan Abdelazim. It remains an illegal party and has been subject to sporadic repression; although it became semi-openly active after the accession of Bashar al-Assad to power in 2000, and under the limited liberalization that followed. The DASU is the leading member of the National Democratic Gathering, a nationalist-leftist opposition alliance founded in 1979.

Parliamentary elections

See also
:Category:Arab Socialist Union Party (Syria) politicians

External links
Syrian ASU Party website (in Arabic)

1973 establishments in Syria
Arab nationalism in Syria
Arab Socialist Union
Nasserist political parties
Pan-Arabist political parties
Political parties established in 1973
Political parties in Syria
Socialist parties in Syria

de:Arabische Sozialistische Union#ASU und DASU in Syrien